Paleoceanography and Paleoclimatology is a peer-reviewed scientific journal published by the American Geophysical Union. It publishes original research articles dealing with all aspects of understanding and reconstructing Earth’s past climate and environments from the Precambrian to modern analogs. Until the first of January 2018 the name of the journal was Paleoceanography.

The journals founding editor was James P. Kennett, and it is currently edited by Matthew Huber (Purdue University).

Abstracting and indexing
The journal is abstracted and indexed by GEOBASE, GeoRef, Scopus, and several CSA indexes. According to the Journal Citation Reports, the journal has a 2021 impact factor of 3.990.

Notable articles

As of January 2014, the three most highly cited articles are:

References

External links

Publications established in 1986
Oceanography journals
Paleontology journals
American Geophysical Union academic journals
Wiley (publisher) academic journals
English-language journals
Monthly journals
Paleoclimatology
Paleoceanography